The Lacturidae comprise a family of moths in the superfamily Zygaenoidea. Brightly coloured tropical moths, the Lacturidae have been previously placed in the Plutellidae, Yponomeutidae, and Hyponomeutidae.

Selected genera
Anticrates
Gymnogramma
Lactura

References
 , 1995: Lacturidae, new family (Lepidoptera: Zygaenoidea). Tropical Lepidoptera Research 6 (2): 146–148. Full article: .
Pitkin, B. & P. Jenkins. Butterflies and Moths of the World: Generic Names and their Type-species. Natural History Museum.

External links

ala.org.au Images of Australian Lacturidae

Zygaenoidea
Moth families